Aylacostoma stigmaticum is a species of freshwater snail, aquatic gastropod mollusc in the family Thiaridae. This species disappeared after the building of the Yacyretá Dam on the Paraná River, in between Argentina and Paraguay. Although listed as extinct in the wild by the IUCN, no captive population survives meaning that it now is entirely extinct.

See also
 List of non-marine molluscs of Argentina

References

External links
 Vogler R. E. (2013). "The Radula of the Extinct Freshwater Snail Aylacostoma stigmaticum (Caenogastropoda: Thiaridae) from Argentina and Paraguay". Malacologia 56(1-2): 329-332. .

Thiaridae
Gastropods described in 1953
Taxonomy articles created by Polbot